Martin Reißmann (21 September 1900 – 8 April 1971) was a German international footballer.

References

1900 births
1971 deaths
Association football midfielders
German footballers
Germany international footballers